Yolillal is a district of the Upala canton, in the Alajuela province of Costa Rica.

Toponymy  
The name means a place with an abundant yollillo, a plant.

History 
Yolillal was created on 26 November 1980 by Decreto Ejecutivo 12092-G.

Geography 
Yolillal has an area of  km² and an elevation of  metres.

Demographics 

For the 2011 census, Yolillal had a population of  inhabitants.

Transportation

Road transportation 
The district is covered by the following road routes:
 National Route 4
 National Route 138
 National Route 731

References 

Districts of Alajuela Province
Populated places in Alajuela Province